This is a list of terms frequently encountered in the description of -style Japanese woodblock prints and paintings. For a list of print sizes, see below.

 ; "blue picture"
 ; "red picture"
 ; "examined" character found in many censor seals
 ; a tool used to rub the back of a sheet of paper to pick up ink from the block
 ; primitive ukiyo-e style prints, usually printed in pink
 ; primitive ukiyo-e style prints, usually printed in pink and green
 ; pictures of beautiful women
 ; technique of applying a gradation of ink to a moistened block to vary lightness and darkness (value) of a single colour
 Censor seal; from 1790 until 1876 all woodblock prints had to be examined by official censors, and marked with their seals
 ; a print size about 
 ; a print size about 
 ; dating from 1603 to 1868, the period when Japanese society was under the rule of the Tokugawa shogunate
 ; "picture book"
 ; colouring with a paintbrush
 ; powdered minerals or metals sprinkled onto a print during the production process
 ; album
 ; "founder" prefix, used on a print to indicate the publisher
 ; a common subject in ukiyo-e
 ; a print
 ; a publisher
 ; a print size about 
 ; a carver of woodblocks
 ; a print size about 
 ; a colour block
 ; prints that can be viewed from either top or bottom
 ; a print that mimics a stone rubbing, with uninked images or text on a dark, usually black, background
 ; a technique for producing gradation achieved by sanding or abrading the edges of the carving
 ; an  diptych arranged one above the other (also a hanging scroll painting) 
 ; paintings of flowers and birds
 ; the artist's tag, used on prints with (or instead of) a signature
 ; region of Japan referring to the cities of Kyoto and Osaka
 ; prints of a single colour (usually black) coloured by stenciling. Prints produced entirely by stenciling, without woodblocks, are also called .
 ; dry printing, embossing
 ; style of woodblock carving imitating dry brushstrokes
 ; one of the Five Routes of the Edo period
 ; "approved" character found in many censor seals
 ; a rough sketch
 ; prints with moveable parts
 ; the highest mountain in Japan, a common subject
 ; warrior print
 ; prints depicting the Japanese mythological giant catfish, the 
 ; a painting in the ukiyo-e style
 ; multi-coloured woodblock printing
 ; a print size about 
 ; portrait prints, busts
 : Schools of ukiyo-e artists
 ; prints depicting the Sino-Japanese and Russo-Japanese Wars
 ; 20th century ukiyo-e revival prints
 ; final preparatory drawing pasted onto the block for printing
 ; a polishing technique sometimes used to create a shiny surface on black areas in prints
 ; erotically themed art
 ; privately commissioned prints for special occasions such as the New Year
 ; a printer
 ; primitive ukiyo-e style prints, usually printed in red
 ; a print in vertical or "portrait" format
 ; an array of economic policies introduced in 1842 by the Tokugawa Shogunate, precursor to Meiji Restoration
 ; the most important of the Five Routes of the Edo period
 ; prints on paddle-shaped hand fans
 ; a picture using linear perspective
 ; the culture of Edo-period Japan (1600–1867)
 ; paintings painted with lacquer, and a printing style using ink that resembles the darkness and thickness of black lacquer
 ; Japanese poetry
 ; traditional Japanese paper
 ; prints of kabuki actors
 ; a print in horizontal or "landscape" format
 ; prints depicting non-East Asian foreigners and scenes of Yokohama.

Print sizes

Below is a table of common Tokugawa-period print sizes. Sizes varied depending on the period, and those given are approximate they are based on the pre-printing paper sizes, and paper was often trimmed after printing.

See also
 Schools of ukiyo-e artists
 Ukiyo-e
 Woodblock printing in Japan

References
Citations

Sources
 
 
 Lane, Richard. (1978).  Images from the Floating World, The Japanese Print. Oxford: Oxford University Press.   OCLC 5246796
 Newland, Amy Reigle. (2005). Hotei Encyclopedia of Japanese Woodblock Prints.  Amsterdam: Hotei.   OCLC 61666175

External links
 A glossary of ukiyo-e terms
 Another glossary of ukiyo-e terms



Printmaking
Japanese art
Japanese art terminology
Japanese culture-related lists
Glossaries of the arts
Wikipedia glossaries using unordered lists